Count Franz Deym (23 August 1838 at Neuschloss (now Dolní Olešnice) – 3 September 1903 at Eckersdorf, Glatz (now Bożków, Kłodzko)) was an Austrian diplomat.

His full title was Franz de Paula Severin Wenzel Maria Philipp Benitius Graf Deym von Střítež.

Life
Deym was the son of a Field Marshal, and was a First Lieutenant in the Lancers. In 1864 he joined the Diplomatic Service. He was first Attaché then  (Secretary) in Paris, before being sent to the Embassy in Rome.

In 1871 he became the Special Ambassador and Acting Minister for the armed services, and then retired from public life. In 1879 he became a member of the Austrian Reichsrat, and was re-elected in 1885. On 18 October 1888 he became Ambassador to London, a position he held until his death.

Sources
 
 

1838 births
1903 deaths
People from Trutnov District
People from the Kingdom of Bohemia
Bohemian nobility
Counts of Austria
German Bohemian people
Members of the Austrian House of Deputies (1879–1885)
Members of the Austrian House of Deputies (1885–1891)
Members of the House of Lords (Austria)
Austrian diplomats
19th-century Austrian people
Knights of the Golden Fleece of Austria